Cyril Charles Done (21 October 1920 – 24 February 1993) was an English footballer. A "strong centre-forward", he scored 127 goals in 232 league appearances in the Football League.

He began his career at Liverpool just before the outbreak of World War II, and was a prolific goalscorer at Anfield throughout the war. After the war he helped the "Reds" to the First Division title in 1946–47, before falling out of the first team picture until his departure to Tranmere Rovers in May 1952. He hit 61 goals in 87 league appearances at Prenton Park, before he moved to Port Vale in December 1954. He hit four goals against Liverpool and hit 34 goals in 52 league games, before switching to non-league Winsford United in May 1957. He later served Skelmersdale United as player-manager from 1959 to 1962.

Career
Born in Liverpool, Done played for Bootle Boys' Brigade before being spotted as a 17-year-old by "Reds" manager George Kay who took him to Anfield in January 1938. He made his debut 18 months later on 2 September 1939 in a 1–0 home win over Chelsea; and it was Done who got the winner, thus opening his account in the same match. This game proved to be the last 'official' game for six years due to the outbreak of World War II; during the war he scored 147 goals in 137 games. Done rejoined Liverpool after the war; after missing the first nine games of the 1946–47 season he made an impact on the side by scoring the "Reds" goal in their 1–1 home draw with Charlton. He then followed this up by scoring his first hat-trick for the club on 19 October 1946 at Leeds Road, his goals, which came in the 29th, 43rd and 76th minute, along with a Jack Balmer last minute strike helped humble their hosts, Huddersfield, by a 4–1 scoreline. He repeated this feat, this time at Anfield on 12 February 1947 in a 5–0 victory over Grimsby, his goals came in the 24th, 40th and 85th minutes, Willie Fagan scored the other two in the 30th and 32nd minutes. Done's contribution in his 17 league appearances, scoring 10 goals, went a long way in helping Liverpool go on to win the first post-war championship. Liverpool dropped to 14th in 1947–48, and Done played just the six games. The club finished in mid-table again in 1948–49, with Done scoring 13 goals in 28 games. Done struggled to hold down a place in the Liverpool starting line-up and completely missed out on the 1950 FA Cup run; he scored five goals in 16 league games. He scored three goals in 25 games in 1950–51, and got four goals in 12 games in 1951–52.

Done was allowed to leave Anfield in May 1952, having played 111 games in official league and cup competitions, scoring 38 goals. He joined Merseyside neighbours Tranmere Rovers of the Third Division North, where he made more of an impact, scoring 61 goals in 87 league appearances in his time at the club. During his time at Prenton Park, Tranmere were a mid-table club under the stewardship of Ernest Blackburn.

Cyril transferred to Port Vale in December 1954, when manager Freddie Steele paid out a four-figure fee. He scored in five consecutive games, as the club struggled in front of goal; he bagged six of Vale's eight goals in a run of just one win in nine games. He then faced his former employers, Liverpool, and gave them a reason to think that they had let him go too soon, as he got all four goals in Vale's 4–3 Second Division home win. He was the club's top scorer in 1954–55 with 13 goals in 18 appearances. Done then found the net 12 times in 18 games in 1956–57, with teammate Len Stephenson only scoring two more goals in almost twice the number of games. He hit nine goals in 16 games in 1956–57 to become the club's top-scorer in a dismal season at Vale Park, which saw the "Valiants" relegated in last place. In May 1957 he was given a free transfer to non-league side Winsford United, and later became player-manager of Skelmersdale United.

Style of play
Done was a "strong centre-forward, who was feared by opposing defences".

Post-retirement
Upon retirement from the game Done worked raising awareness for a cancer charity. He died on 24 February 1993, the same day as fellow footballer Bobby Moore.

Career statistics
Source:

Honours
Liverpool
Football League First Division: 1946–47

References

1920 births
1993 deaths
Footballers from Liverpool
English footballers
Association football forwards
Liverpool F.C. players
Tranmere Rovers F.C. players
Port Vale F.C. players
Winsford United F.C. players
Skelmersdale United F.C. players
English Football League players
Association football player-managers
English football managers